Rhee Dae-eun (Hangul: 이대은, Hanja: 李帶溵; born March 23, 1989) is a South Korean pitcher who plays for the KT Wiz.

Career

Early years 
Rhee was signed by the Chicago Cubs in 2007 out of high school. He spent seven seasons in the Cubs' minor league system, appearing in 135 games to compile a 40–37 record with a 4.08 ERA. During the time, he never pitched in the majors and only got as far as a Triple-A team.

He next spent two years with the Chiba Lotte Marines of the Nippon Professional Baseball (NPB), before pitching for the National Police Agency team of the KBO Futures League in South Korea during his mandatory military service. In the Futures League, Rhee compiled a 5–6 record in 18 appearances, posting a 3.83 ERA in  innings.

KT Wiz 
On September 10, 2018, Rhee was picked #1 by the KT Wiz in the 2019 KBO Draft. He will play as the closer for the KT Wiz in the 2020 season.

Personal life 
He will be marrying rapper Trudy on December 5. The wedding was originally scheduled to take place in December of last year. But it was postponed once due to the spread of COVID-19.

Filmography

Television show

Career statistics

References

External links 

 Career statistics and player information from Minor League Baseball
 Career statistics and player information from Nippon Professional Baseball

1989 births
Living people
South Korean expatriate baseball players in the United States
South Korean expatriate baseball players in Japan
Chiba Lotte Marines players
Nippon Professional Baseball pitchers
Baseball players from Seoul
2015 WBSC Premier12 players
Iowa Cubs players
Daytona Cubs players
Tennessee Smokies players
Boise Hawks players
Peoria Chiefs players
Arizona League Cubs players
2017 World Baseball Classic players